Laurence Naismith (born Lawrence Johnson; 14 December 1908 – 5 June 1992) was an English actor. He made numerous film and television appearances, including starring roles in the musical films Scrooge (1970) and the children's ghost film The Amazing Mr. Blunden (1972). He also had memorable roles as Captain Edward Smith of the RMS Titanic in A Night to Remember (1958), the First Sea Lord in Sink the Bismarck! (1960), and Argus in Jason and the Argonauts (1963).

Early life and career
Naismith was born as Lawrence Johnson in Thames Ditton, Surrey, in 1908. He attended All Saints Choir School, Margaret Street, London, and was a chorus member for a 1927 production of the George Gershwin musical Oh, Kay!. He later worked in repertory theatre and ran a repertory company of his own. Naismith served in the British Merchant Navy and at the outbreak of the Second World War, he joined the British Army where he became an officer in the Royal Artillery.

Film
His film roles included Carrington V.C. (1954), Richard III (1955), The Man Who Never Was (1956), A Night to Remember (1958), Sink the Bismarck! (1960), The World of Suzie Wong (1960) and Jason and the Argonauts (1963). He played the non-singing role of Merlin in the 1967 film version of the musical Camelot and appeared in the James Bond film Diamonds Are Forever (1971) as the chairman of the diamond trading syndicate.

Television
In 1965, Naismith played the title role of the Virginia statesman George Mason in the NBC documentary series, Profiles in Courage. William Bakewell played George Wythe in the episode, and Arthur Franz was cast as James Madison. In 1965, Naismith guest-starred as barber Gilly Bright in episode 25, "The Threat" of the ABC military drama, 12 O'Clock High and Dr. McCallister in the ABC action drama, The Fugitive, starring David Janssen. In 1969 he played Don Q Hought in an episode of Bonanza. He played Judge Fulton in the television series The Persuaders! (1971), with Tony Curtis and Roger Moore. He portrayed Emperor of Austria Franz Joseph in the BBC production Fall of Eagles (1974). Naismith played the Prince of Verona in the BBC Television Shakespeare version of Romeo and Juliet. He also appeared in the BBC sitcom Oh, Father! (1972) and played in The Invaders (1967–68) with Roy Thinnes.

Stage
In 1934 he appeared alongside Jack Buchanan in the musical Mr. Whittington in London's West End. He appeared on Broadway in the Meredith Willson musical Here's Love in 1963, opposite Janis Paige.

Filmography

 A Piece of Cake (1948) as Merlin Mound 
 Trouble in the Air (1948) as Tom Hunt
 Badger's Green (1949) as Mr. Butler
 Kind Hearts and Coronets (1949) as Warder in Jail (uncredited)
 Train of Events (1949) as Joe Hunt (segment "The Actor")
 The Chiltern Hundreds (1949) as Reporter (uncredited)
 Room to Let (1950) as Editor
 The Happiest Days of Your Life (1950) as Dr. Collet
 Pool of London (1951) as Commissionaire (uncredited)
 Hell is Sold Out (1951) as Dr. Monceau
 There Is Another Sun (1951) as Riley
 Chelsea Story (1951) as Sergeant Matthews
 Calling Bulldog Drummond (1951) as Hardcastle, Card Player (uncredited)
 High Treason (1951) as Reginald Gordon-Wells
 His Excellency (1952) as First Soldier
 Whispering Smith Hits London (1952) as Parker
 The Happy Family (1952) as Councillor
 I Believe in You (1952) as Sergeant Braxton
 Mother Riley Meets the Vampire (1952) as Police Sergeant at Desk (uncredited)
 Penny Princess (1952) as Louis the Jailkeeper (uncredited)
 A Killer Walks (1952) as Doctor James
 The Long Memory (1952) as Hasbury
 Cosh Boy (1953) as Inspector Donaldson
 Time Bomb (1953) as Ambulance Man (uncredited)
 Rough Shoot (1953) as Blossom 
 The Beggar's Opera (1953) as Matt of the Mint
 Mogambo (1953) as Skipper
 Love in Pawn (1953) as Uncle Ramos
 The Million Pound Note (1954) as Walter Craddock (uncredited)
 The Black Knight (1954) as Major Domo
 Carrington V.C. (1954) as Major Panton
 The Dam Busters (1955) as Farmer
 Josephine and Men (1955) as Porter
 Richard III (1955) as The Lord Stanley
 The Man Who Never Was (1956) as Adm. Cross
 The Weapon (1956) as Jamison
 Lust for Life (1956) as Dr. Bosman
 Tiger in the Smoke (1956) as Canon Avril
 The Extra Day (1956) as Kurt Von
 The Barretts of Wimpole Street (1957) as Dr. Chambers 
 Seven Waves Away (1957) as Captain Paul Darrow
 Boy on a Dolphin (1957) as Dr. Hawkins
 Robbery Under Arms (1957) as Ben Marston
 The Gypsy and the Gentleman (1958) as Dr. Forrester
 I Accuse! (1958) as Judge, Esterhazy Trial
 Gideon's Day (1958) as Arthur Sayer
 A Night to Remember (1958) as Capt. Edward John Smith
 The Two-Headed Spy (1958) as Gen. Hauser
 Tempest (1958) as Maj. Zurin
 Solomon and Sheba (1959) as Hezrai
 Third Man on the Mountain (1959) as Teo Zurbriggen
 Sink the Bismarck! (1960) as First Sea Lord
 The Angry Silence (1960) as Martindale
 The Trials of Oscar Wilde (1960) as Prince of Wales
 Village of the Damned (1960) as Doctor Willers
 The Criminal (1960) as Mr. Town
 The World of Suzie Wong (1960) as O'Neill
 The Singer Not the Song (1961) as Old Uncle
 Greyfriars Bobby (1961) as Mr. Traill
 The Valiant (1962) as Admiral
 I Thank a Fool (1962) as O'Grady
 The 300 Spartans (1962) as First Delegate
 We Joined the Navy (1962) as Admiral Blake
 Cleopatra (1963) as Arachesilaus (uncredited)
 Jason and the Argonauts (1963) as Argus
 The Three Lives of Thomasina (1963) as Reverend Angus Peddie
 Sky West and Crooked (1965) as Edwin Dacres 
 Deadlier Than the Male (1967) as Sir John Bledlow
 Camelot (1967) as Merlyn
 The Scorpio Letters (1967) as Burr
 The Long Duel (1967) as McDougal
 Fitzwilly (1967) as Mr. Cotty (uncredited)
 Eye of the Cat (1969) as Dr. Mills
 The Valley of Gwangi (1969) as Professor Bromley
 The Bushbaby (1969) as Prof. 'Cranky' Crankshaw
 Run a Crooked Mile (1969) as Lord Dunnsfield
 Scrooge (1970) as Mr. Fezziwig
 Quest for Love (1971) as Sir Henry Larnstein
 Diamonds Are Forever (1971) as Sir Donald Munger
 Young Winston (1972) as Lord Salisbury
 The Amazing Mr Blunden (1972) as Mr. Blunden

Television

 The Adventures of Robin Hood (1956) as Sir William de Courcier
 Danger Man (1960) as Spooner
 The Prince and the Pauper (1962) as Earl of Hertford
 Profiles in Courage (1965) as John Quincy Adams/George Mason
 The Fugitive (1965-1967) as Major Fielding/Dr. Andrew Emmett McAllister/John Mallory 
 The Invaders (1967) as Professor Curtis Lindstrom/Cyrus Stone
 Bonanza (1969) as Don Q. Hought
 ‘’The Persuaders!’’ (1971) as Judge Fulton
 Fall of Eagles (1974) as Emperor Franz Josef
 Romeo and Juliet (1978) as Prince Escalus
 I Remember Nelson (1982) as Rev. Edmund Nelson

References

External links
 
 
 

1908 births
1992 deaths
20th-century American male actors
20th-century English male actors
British Army personnel of World War II
British expatriate male actors in the United States
British Merchant Navy personnel
English male film actors
English male television actors
Male actors from Los Angeles
People from Thames Ditton
People from Queensland
Royal Artillery officers